Stelian Mladenov Kamburov Trasborg (born 21 July 1989 in Denmark) is a Bulgarian footballer, who is currently contracted with HIK in the Danish 2nd Division.

Career
Trasborg began his career with Greve IF and signed 2006 for Danish 1st Division club Lyngby BK. In July 2010 left Lyngby Boldklub and signed a three years contract with Elite 3000 Helsingør.

International career
He was born in Denmark and has played youth internationals for the Bulgaria national under-19 football team.

Notes

1989 births
Living people
Bulgarian footballers
Lyngby Boldklub players
Danish men's footballers
Danish people of Bulgarian descent
Bulgarian people of Danish descent
Association football midfielders